The 2009 Detroit Tigers season was the team's 109th season.  The Tigers' new slogan for 2009 was "Always a Tiger." It replaced the 2006–2008 slogan "Who's Your Tiger?"

The Tigers ended the season on October 6 with a 6–5 loss in 12 innings to the Minnesota Twins in the tie-breaker game to win the AL Central. The Tigers spent 146 days in first place and became the first team in Major League history to lose a three-game lead with four games left to play.

2008–2009 offseason events
The Tigers announced on September 29, 2008, that they would not pick up the $12 million option on shortstop Édgar Rentería's contract, although the team did not rule out the possibility of re-signing him in the offseason. The buyout was worth $3 million. The option was part of the contract Rentería signed with the Boston Red Sox in 2004. He had changed teams twice since then. The roster move was finalized on October 30. The team could have offered him arbitration and received a draft pick from Rentería's new team, but formally chose not to offer Rentería arbitration on December 1. On December 4, 2008, Rentería signed a two-year deal with the San Francisco Giants.
On October 17, the Tigers hired Rick Knapp as their new pitching coach, replacing Chuck Hernandez, who took part of the blame for the team's poor pitching in 2008. Knapp had worked for 12 years as the minor league pitching coordinator for the Minnesota Twins.
The Red Sox claimed Tiger reliever Virgil Vasquez off waivers on October 28. Vasquez had spent the entire season as a starter with the Toledo Mud Hens, the Tigers' AAA affiliate.
On December 8, the Tigers acquired catcher Gerald Laird from the Texas Rangers, in exchange for minor league pitching prospects Guillermo Moscoso and Carlos Melo.
On December 10, the Tigers traded outfielder Matt Joyce to the Tampa Bay Rays for starting pitcher Edwin Jackson. Joyce had divided his time in the previous season between the Tigers and Class AAA Toledo.
On December 12, the Tigers signed infielder Ramón Santiago to a one-year contract, avoiding arbitration.
Also on December 12, in a Rule 5 draft, the Tigers selected left-handed pitcher Kyle Bloom from the Pittsburgh Pirates double-A affiliate, Altoona. Detroit would return Bloom to the Pirates in March 2009. In the same draft, they lost James Skelton, a  left-handed hitting catcher, to the Arizona Diamondbacks. Skelton was on Detroit's 2008 40-man roster but was not included on the 40-man cast for 2009.
On December 13, relief pitcher Aquilino López became the Tigers' only arbitration-eligible player this offseason to not be offered a contract by the team, making him a free agent.
On December 15, the Tigers finalized a one-year, $1 million contract with free-agent shortstop Adam Everett, previously with the Minnesota Twins.
On December 18, former Marlins catcher Matt Treanor signed with the Tigers.
On January 6, 2009, the Tigers signed former utility outfielder Alexis Gómez to a minor-league contract. Gómez had played on the 2006 World Series team, but had spent the subsequent two seasons in the Colorado Rockies and Florida Marlins systems.
On January 13, the Tigers signed Taiwanese sidearm relief pitcher Fu-Te Ni to a minor-league contract with an invitation to training camp. Ni had pitched for Taiwan at the 2008 Summer Olympics in Beijing.
On January 14, the team avoided arbitration with relief pitcher Fernando Rodney and utility outfielder Marcus Thames by signing both to one-year contracts.
On January 20, the team avoided arbitration with catcher Gerald Laird, starting pitcher Edwin Jackson, and relievers Joel Zumaya and Bobby Seay by signing each to one-year contracts. The same day, the Tigers signed Juan Rincón to a minor-league contract with an invite to spring training.
On January 26, the Tigers signed relief pitcher Brandon Lyon to a one-year contract. The same day, the team signed Timo Pérez to a minor-league contract.
On February 3, the Tigers avoided arbitration with starting pitcher Justin Verlander by signing him to a one-year, $3.7 million contract.
On February 4, the organization outrighted pitcher Eddie Bonine to the Mud Hens after clearing waivers. He had spent most of the 2008 season with the Mud Hens.
On February 24, the Tigers came to terms with relief pitchers Clay Rapada and Freddy Dolsi, and outfielders Brent Clevlen, Ryan Raburn and Wilkin Ramírez, all to one-year contracts.
On March 19, the Tigers outrighted relief pitcher Macay McBride to Toledo.
On March 29, the Tigers placed relievers Joel Zumaya and Dontrelle Willis on the 15-day disabled list.  Zumaya, who had had a history of shoulder problems, was due to be activated April 11, one day after the Tigers' home opener against Texas.  Willis was placed on the list due to an anxiety disorder.
On March 30, the Tigers acquired speedy outfielder Josh Anderson from the Atlanta Braves for pitching prospect Rudy Darrow. Anderson hit .294 with three home runs, 12 RBIs and ten stolen bases with Atlanta in 2008.
In a surprise move, the Tigers released nine-time All-Star Gary Sheffield on March 31.  Sheffield, who joined the Tigers before the 2007 season, was one home run short of the 500 club when he was released.

Trades

On July 30, the Tigers traded outfielder Josh Anderson to Kansas City for cash considerations.

On July 31, the Tigers traded rookie left-handed pitcher Luke French and left-handed pitcher Mauricio Robles to Seattle for veteran left-handed starting pitcher Jarrod Washburn.

On August 17, the Tigers traded pitcher Brett Jacobson to Baltimore for Aubrey Huff.

Season highlights

The Tigers' home opener was on April 10 against the Texas Rangers. The Tigers won that game 15–2, which included a grand slam by Miguel Cabrera and finished the series with a sweep.

The Tigers swept their rivals the Indians in Cleveland during the second weekend of May. The Tigers also completed back-to-back sweeps in May, against the Athletics and the Rangers.  The Tigers also completed back-to-back sweeps in late June, over the Brewers and Cubs.

On May 15, the Tigers hit 2 grand slams in a game, only the third time in team history.

On June 19, Instant replay was used twice in the Tigers' 10–4 victory over the Milwaukee Brewers at Comerica Park, the first time that's happened in league history. Miguel Cabrera's third-inning single off the top of the wall is called a home run after instant replay review shows that it had actually cleared the wall. Contrarily, Dusty Ryan's fourth-inning home run was overturned to a ground rule double. Later that weekend, the Tigers won the series with a sweep.

On May 19, Dontrelle Willis and four relief pitchers combined to throw a one-hitter in a 4–0 Tigers Victory.  Willis had a stretch in which he retired 17 straight batters 

The Tigers completed back-to-back sweeps against the Indians and Rays in early September.

The Tigers held the 1st-place position from May 8 until they lost it to the Twins in the tiebreaker game on October 6.

The Tigers swept the Indians for the third time of the season in late September.

Regular season

Season standings

Roster

Record vs. opponents

Game log

|- bgcolor="ffbbbb"
| 1 || April 6 || @ Blue Jays || L 12–5 || Halladay (1–0) || Verlander (0–1) || || 48,027 || 0–1
|- bgcolor="ffbbbb"
| 2 || April 7 || @ Blue Jays || L 5–4 || Ryan (1–0) || Lyon (0–1) || || 16,790 || 0–2
|- bgcolor="bbffbb"
| 3 || April 8 || @ Blue Jays || W 5–1 || Miner (1–0) || Litsch (0–1) || || 12,145 || 1–2
|- bgcolor="ffbbbb"
| 4 || April 9 || @ Blue Jays || L 6–2 || Romero (1–0) || Porcello (0–1) || || 15,297 || 1–3
|- bgcolor="bbffbb"
| 5 || April 10 || Rangers || W 15–2 || Galarraga (1–0) || Benson (0–1) || || 44,588 || 2–3
|- bgcolor="bbffbb"
| 6 || April 11 || Rangers || W 4–3 || Robertson (1–0) || Harrison (0–1) || Rodney (1) || 28,693 || 3–3
|- bgcolor="bbffbb"
| 7 || April 12 || Rangers || W 6–4 || Lyon (1–1) || Wilson (0–1) || Rodney (2) || 18,905 || 4–3
|- bgcolor="ffbbbb"
| 8 || April 13 || White Sox || L 10–6 || Floyd (1–1) || Miner (1–1) || || 21,850 || 4–4
|- bgcolor="bbbbbb"
| || April 14 || White Sox || colspan=6 | Postponed (rain) – rescheduled for July 24
|- bgcolor="bbffbb"
| 9 || April 15 || White Sox || W 9–0 || Galarraga (2–0) || Contreras (0–2) || || 20,212 || 5–4
|- bgcolor="ffbbbb"
| 10 || April 17 || @ Mariners || L 6–3 || Hernández (2–0) || Verlander (0–2) || Morrow (3) || 35,824 || 5–5
|- bgcolor="bbffbb"
| 11 || April 18 || @ Mariners || W 2–0 || Jackson (1–0) || Bédard (1–1) || Rodney (3) || 31,966 || 6–5
|- bgcolor="bbffbb"
| 12 || April 19 || @ Mariners || W 8–2 || Porcello (1–1) || Silva (0–2) || || 30,450 || 7–5
|- bgcolor="ffbbbb"
| 13 || April 21 || @ Angels || L 4–3 || Arredondo (1–0) || Lyon (1–2) || Fuentes (3) || 41,627 || 7–6
|- bgcolor="bbffbb"
| 14 || April 22 || @ Angels || W 12–10 || Rincón (1–0) || Shields (0–2) || || 43,047 || 8–6
|- bgcolor="ffbbbb"
| 15 || April 23 || @ Angels || L 10–5 || Palmer (1–0) || Jackson (1–1) || || 38,543 || 8–7
|- bgcolor="ffbbbb"
| 16 || April 24 || @ Royals || L 6–1 || Greinke (4–0) || Porcello (1–2) || || 36,363 || 8–8
|- bgcolor="bbffbb"
| 17 || April 25 || @ Royals || W 9–1 || Miner (2–1) || Davies (1–1) || || 37,647 || 9–8
|- bgcolor="bbffbb"
| 18 || April 26 || @ Royals || W 3–2 || Galarraga (3–0) || Ponson (0–3) || Rodney (4) || 13,520 || 10–8
|- bgcolor="bbffbb"
| 19 || April 27 || Yankees || W 4–2 || Verlander (1–2) || Sabathia (1–2) || || 28,784 || 11–8
|- bgcolor="ffbbbb"
| 20 || April 28 || Yankees || L 11–0 || Hughes (1–0) || Perry (0–1) || || 25,519 || 11–9
|- bgcolor="ffbbbb"
| 21 || April 29 || Yankees || L 8–6 || Chamberlain (1–0) || Porcello (1–3) || || 28,348 || 11–10
|-

|- bgcolor="ffbbbb"
| 22 || May 1 || Indians || L 6–5 || Pavano (1–3) || Galarraga (3–1) || Wood (5) || 22,288 || 11–11
|- bgcolor="bbffbb"
| 23 || May 2 || Indians || W 9–7 || Zumaya (1–0) || Betancourt (0–1) || Rodney (5) || 34,646 || 12–11
|- bgcolor="bbffbb"
| 24 || May 3 || Indians || W 3–1 || Verlander (2–2) || Lee (1–4) || Rodney (6) || 27,411 || 13–11
|- bgcolor="ffbbbb"
| 25 || May 4 || Twins || L 7–2 || Liriano (1–4) || Jackson (1–2) || || 21,298 || 13–12
|- bgcolor="bbffbb"
| 26 || May 5 || Twins || W 9–0 || Porcello (2–3) || Blackburn (2–2) || || 23,754 || 14–12
|- bgcolor="bbbbbb"
| || May 6 || @ White Sox || colspan=6 | Postponed (rain) – rescheduled for June 8
|- bgcolor="ffbbbb"
| 27 || May 7 || @ White Sox || L 6–0 || Buehrle (5–0) || Galarraga (3–2) || || 27,475 || 14–13
|- bgcolor="bbffbb"
| 28 || May 8 || @ Indians || W 1–0 || Verlander (3–2) || Lee (1–5) || || 27,492 || 15–13
|- bgcolor="bbffbb"
| 29 || May 9 || @ Indians || W 4–0 || Jackson (2–2) || Carmona (1–4) || || 33,640 || 16–13
|- bgcolor="bbffbb"
| 30 || May 10 || @ Indians || W 5–3 || Porcello (3–3) || Reyes (1–1) || || 25,705 || 17–13
|- bgcolor="ffbbbb"
| 31 || May 12 || @ Twins || L 6–2 || Slowey (5–1) || Galarraga (3–3) || || 24,807 || 17–14
|- bgcolor="ffbbbb"
| 32 || May 13 || @ Twins || L 14–10 (13) || Crain (2–1) || Lyon (1–3) || || 22,178 || 17–15
|- bgcolor="ffbbbb"
| 33 || May 14 || @ Twins || L 6–5 || Breslow (1–1) || Seay (0–1) || Nathan (6) || 26,046 || 17–16
|- bgcolor="bbffbb"
| 34 || May 15 || Athletics || W 14–1 || Jackson (3–2) || Anderson (0–4) || || 26,770 || 18–16
|- bgcolor="bbffbb"
| 35 || May 16 || Athletics || W 9–1 || Porcello (4–3) || Braden (3–5) || || 31,554 || 19–16
|- bgcolor="bbffbb"
| 36 || May 17 || Athletics || W 11–7 || Miner (3–1) || Cahill (2–3) || || 27,535 || 20–16
|- bgcolor="bbffbb"
| 37 || May 19 || Rangers || W 4–0 || Willis (1–0) || McCarthy (3–2) || || 23,756 || 21–16
|- bgcolor="bbffbb"
| 38 || May 20 || Rangers || W 5–3 || Verlander (4–2) || Harrison (4–3) || Rodney (7) || 23,417 || 22–16
|- bgcolor="bbffbb"
| 39 || May 21 || Rangers || W 4–3 || Jackson (4–2) || Millwood (4–4) || Rodney (8) || 34,356 || 23–16
|- bgcolor="bbffbb"
| 40 || May 22 || Rockies || W 4–3 || Porcello (5–3) || Jiménez (3–5) || Zumaya (1) || 28,264 || 24–16
|- bgcolor="ffbbbb"
| 41 || May 23 || Rockies || L 4–3 || Marquis (6–3) || Galarraga (3–4) || Street (6) || 37,035 || 24–17
|- bgcolor="ffbbbb"
| 42 || May 24 || Rockies || L 3–1 || Hammel (1–3) || Willis (1–1) || Street (7) || 34,606 || 24–18
|- bgcolor="bbffbb"
| 43 || May 25 || @ Royals || W 13–1 || Verlander (5–2) || Meche (2–5) || || 34,524 || 25–18
|- bgcolor="ffbbbb"
| 44 || May 26 || @ Royals || L 6–1 || Greinke (8–1) || Jackson (4–3) || || 16,366 || 25–19
|- bgcolor="bbffbb"
| 45 || May 27 || @ Royals || W 8–3 || Porcello (6–3) || Davies (2–4) || || 16,568 || 26–19
|- bgcolor="ffbbbb"
| 46 || May 28 || @ Orioles || L 5–1 || Hernandez (1–0) || Galarraga (3–5) || || 11,937 || 26–20
|- bgcolor="ffbbbb"
| 47 || May 29 || @ Orioles || L 7–2 || Bergesen (2–2) || Willis (1–2) || || 42,704 || 26–21
|- bgcolor="bbffbb"
| 48 || May 30 || @ Orioles || W 6–3 || Verlander (6–2) || Albers (0–2) || Rodney (9) || 34,567 || 27–21
|- bgcolor="bbffbb"
| 49 || May 31 || @ Orioles || W 3–0 || Jackson (5–3) || Berken (1–1) || Rodney (10) || 32,233 || 28–21
|-

|- bgcolor="ffbbbb"
| 50 || June 2 || Red Sox || L 5–1 || Matsuzaka (1–3) || Porcello (6–4) || || 25,914 || 28–22
|- bgcolor="ffbbbb"
| 51 || June 3 || Red Sox || L 10–5 || Beckett (6–2) || Galarraga (3–6) || || 29,240 || 28–23
|- bgcolor="ffbbbb"
| 52 || June 4 || Red Sox || L 6–3 || Wakefield (7–3) || Willis (1–3) || Papelbon (14) || 31,353 || 28–24
|- bgcolor="ffbbbb"
| 53 || June 5 || Angels || L 2–1 || Santana (1–2) || Rodney (0–1) || Fuentes (15) || 31,187 || 28–25
|- bgcolor="bbffbb"
| 54 || June 6 || Angels || W 2–1 || Jackson (6–3) || Escobar (0–1) || || 32,367 || 29–25
|- bgcolor="bbffbb"
| 55 || June 7 || Angels || W 9–6 || Zumaya (2–0) || Arredondo (1–3) || || 32,074 || 30–25
|- bgcolor="bbffbb"
| 56 || June 8 || @ White Sox || W 5–4 || Zumaya (3–0) || Linebrink (2–3) || Rodney (11) || || 31–25
|- bgcolor="ffbbbb"
| 57 || June 8 || @ White Sox || L 6–1 || Contreras (1–5) || Bonderman (0–1) || || 30,809 || 31–26
|- bgcolor="bbffbb"
| 58 || June 9 || @ White Sox || W 7–6 (10) || Lyon (2–3) || Linebrink (2–4) || || 25,676 || 32–26
|- bgcolor="bbffbb"
| 59 || June 10 || @ White Sox || W 2–1 || Verlander (7–2) || Danks (4–5) || || 28,079 || 33–26
|- bgcolor="ffbbbb"
| 60 || June 11 || @ White Sox || L 4–3 || Jenks (1–2) || Zumaya (3–1) || || 20,824 || 33–27
|- bgcolor="bbffbb"
| 61 || June 12 || @ Pirates || W 3–1 || Porcello (7–4) || Snell (1–7) || Rodney (12) || 18,369 || 34–27
|- bgcolor="ffbbbb"
| 62 || June 13 || @ Pirates || L 9–3 || Duke (7–4) || Galarraga (3–7) || || 31,411 || 34–28
|- bgcolor="ffbbbb"
| 63 || June 14 || @ Pirates || L 6–3 || Ohlendorf (6–5) || Willis (1–4) || Capps (16) || 27,565 || 34–29
|- bgcolor="ffbbbb"
| 64 || June 16 || @ Cardinals || L 11–2 || Wainwright (7–4) || Verlander (7–3) || || 44,021 || 34–30
|- bgcolor="ffbbbb"
| 65 || June 17 || @ Cardinals || L 4–3 || Wellemeyer (6–6) || Jackson (6–4) || Franklin (16) || 39,699 || 34–31
|- bgcolor="bbffbb"
| 66 || June 18 || @ Cardinals || W 6–3 || Porcello (8–4)|| Piñeiro (5–8) || Rodney (13) || 41,323 || 35–31
|- bgcolor="bbffbb"
| 67 || June 19 || Brewers || W 10–4 (7) || Miner (4–1) || Looper (5–4) || || 34,112 || 36–31
|- bgcolor="bbffbb"
| 68 || June 20 || Brewers || W 9–5 || Figaro (1–0) || Bush (3–4) || || 39,156 || 37–31
|- bgcolor="bbffbb"
| 69 || June 21 || Brewers || W 3–2 || Verlander (8–3) || Gallardo (7–4) || Rodney (14) || 41,163 || 38–31
|- bgcolor="bbffbb"
| 70 || June 23 || Cubs || W 5–4 || Lyon (3–3) || Gregg (2–2) || || 38,046 || 39–31
|- bgcolor="bbffbb"
| 71 || June 24 || Cubs || W 5–3 || Miner (5–1) || Harden (4–4) || Rodney (15) || 36,438 || 40–31
|- bgcolor="bbffbb"
| 72 || June 25 || Cubs || W 6–5 || Galarraga (4–7) || Lilly (7–5) || Rodney (16) || 42,332 || 41–31
|- bgcolor="ffbbbb"
| 73 || June 26 || @ Astros || L 5–4 || Sampson (4–0) || Zumaya (3–2) || Hawkins (10) || 33,052 || 41–32
|- bgcolor="ffbbbb"
| 74 || June 27 || @ Astros || L 8–1 || Paulino (2–4) || Figaro (1–1) || || 37,123 || 41–33
|- bgcolor="bbffbb"
| 75 || June 28 || @ Astros || W 4–3 || Seay (1–1) || Valderde (0–2) || Rodney (17) || 34,041 || 42–33
|- bgcolor="ffbbbb"
| 76 || June 29 || @ Athletics || L 7–1 || Anderson (4–7) || Porcello (8–5) || || 10,563 || 42–34
|- bgcolor="bbffbb"
| 77 || June 30 || @ Athletics || W 5–3 || Galarraga (5–7) || Gonzalez (0–2) || || 12,126 || 43–34
|-

|- bgcolor="ffbbbb"
| 78 || July 1 || @ Athletics || L 5–1 || Braden (6–7) || Verlander (8–4) || || 21,238 || 43–35
|- bgcolor="bbffbb"
| 79 || July 3 || @ Twins || W 11–9 (16) || Dolsi (1–0) || Dickey (1–1) || || 33,368 || 44–35
|- bgcolor="ffbbbb"
| 80 || July 4 || @ Twins || L 4–3 || Guerrier (4–0) || Lyon (3–4) || Nathan (22) || 27,238 || 44–36
|- bgcolor="ffbbbb"
| 81 || July 5 || @ Twins || L 6–2 || Blackburn (7–4) || Porcello (8–6) || || 33,274 || 44–37
|- bgcolor="ffbbbb"
| 82 || July 6 || Royals || L 4–3 || Colón (1–0) || Rodney (0–2) || Soria (13) || 32,134 || 44–38
|- bgcolor="bbffbb"
| 83 || July 7 || Royals || W 8–5 || Verlander (9–4) || Chen (0–3) || Rodney (18) || 29,751 || 45–38
|- bgcolor="bbffbb"
| 84 || July 8 || Royals || W 3–1 || French (1–0) || Greinke (10–5) || Rodney (19) || 29,104 || 46–38
|- bgcolor="bbffbb"
| 85 || July 10 || Indians || W 5–1 || Jackson (7–4) || Lee (5–8) || Rodney (20) || 35,592 ||47–38
|- bgcolor="ffbbbb"
| 86 || July 11 || Indians || L 5–4 || Pavano (8–7) || Galarraga (5–8) || Wood (12) || 41,782 || 47–39
|- bgcolor="bbffbb"
| 87 || July 12 || Indians || W 10–1 || Verlander (10–4) || Ohka (0–3) || || 39,680 || 48–39
|- bgcolor="ffbbbb"
| 88 || July 17 || @ Yankees || L 5–3 || Hughes (4–2) || Zumaya (3–3) || Rivera (24) || 46,197 || 48–40
|- bgcolor="ffbbbb"
| 89 || July 18 || @ Yankees || L 2–1 || Sabathia (9–6) || Verlander (10–5) || Rivera (25) || 46,423 || 48–41
|- bgcolor="ffbbbb"
| 90 || July 19 || @ Yankees || L 2–1 || Chamberlain (5–2) || Jackson (7–5) || Rivera (26) || 46,937 || 48–42
|- bgcolor="bbffbb"
| 91 || July 21 || Mariners || W 9–7 || Porcello (9–6) || Olson (3–4) || Rodney (20) || 32,906 || 49–42
|- bgcolor="ffbbbb"
| 92 || July 22 || Mariners || L 2–1 || Hernández (11–3) || Seay (1–2) || Aardsma (23) || 29,758 || 49–43
|- bgcolor="ffbbbb"
| 93 || July 23 || Mariners || L 2–1 || Washburn (8–6) || French (1–1) || Aardsma (24) || 32,177 || 49–44
|- bgcolor="bbffbb"
| 94 || July 24 || White Sox || W 5–1 || Verlander (11–5) || Contreras (4–9) || || 27,844 || 50–44
|- bgcolor="bbffbb"
| 95 || July 24 || White Sox || W 4–3 || Lyon (4–4) || Linebrink (2–5) || Rodney (21) || 39,375 || 51–44
|- bgcolor="bbffbb"
| 96 || July 25 || White Sox || W 4–3 (10) || Rodney (1–2) || Carrasco (3–1) || || 41,378 || 52–44
|- bgcolor="ffbbbb"
| 97 || July 26 || White Sox || L 5–1 || Richard (4–3) || Porcello (9–7) || || 38,255 || 52–45
|- bgcolor="ffbbbb"
| 98 || July 27 || @ Rangers || L 5–2 || Hunter (3–1) || Galarraga (5–9) || Wilson (11) || 17,137 || 52–46
|- bgcolor="ffbbbb" 
| 99 || July 28 || @ Rangers || L 7–3 || Grilli (1–2) || French (1–2) || || 21,615 || 52–47
|- bgcolor="bbffbb"
| 100 || July 29 || @ Rangers || W 13–5 || Verlander (12–5) || Feldman (9–4) || || 33,235 || 53–47
|- bgcolor="ffbbbb"
| 101 || July 31 || @ Indians || L 6–5 (13) || Ohka (1–4) || Fien (0–1) || || 35,273 || 53–48
|-

|- bgcolor="bbffbb"
| 102 || August 1 || @ Indians || W 4–3 (12) || Seay (2–2) || Veras (4–2)|| Miner (1) || 31,353 || 54–48
|- bgcolor="ffbbbb"
| 103 || August 2 || @ Indians || L 11–1 || Pavano (9–8) || Galarraga (5–10) || || 24,718 || 54–49
|- bgcolor="bbffbb"
| 104 || August 3 || Orioles || W 6–5 || Rodney (2–2) || Báez (4–5) || || 27,857 || 55–49
|- bgcolor="ffbbbb"
| 105 || August 4 || Orioles || L 8–2 || Matusz (1–0) || Washburn (8–7) || || 29,295 || 55–50
|- bgcolor="bbffbb"
| 106 || August 5 || Orioles || W 4–2 || Jackson (8–5) || Guthrie (7–11) || Rodney (22) || 28,978 || 56–50
|- bgcolor="bbffbb"
| 107 || August 6 || Orioles || W 7–3 || Porcello (10–7) || Hernandez (3–4) || Lyon (1) || 31,165 || 57–50
|- bgcolor="bbffbb"
| 108 || August 7 || Twins || W 10–8 || Galarraga (6–10) || Swarzak (3–5) || || 36,444 || 58–50
|- bgcolor="ffbbbb"
| 109 || August 8 || Twins || L 11–0 || Pavano (10–8) || Verlander (12–6) || || 39,685 || 58–51
|- bgcolor="bbffbb"
| 110 || August 9 || Twins || W 8–7 || Lyon (5–4) || Guerrier (5–1) || Rodney (23) || 35,423 || 59–51
|- bgcolor="ffbbbb"
| 111 || August 10 || @ Red Sox || L 6–5 || Ramírez (6–3) || Miner (5–2) || Papelbon (28) || 37,960 || 59–52
|- bgcolor="ffbbbb"
| 112 || August 11 || @ Red Sox || L 7–5 || Tazawa (1–1) || Lambert (0–1) || || 38,013 || 59–53
|- bgcolor="ffbbbb"
| 113 || August 12 || @ Red Sox || L 8–2 || Beckett (14–4) || Miner (5–3) || || 38,124 || 59–54
|- bgcolor="bbffbb"
| 114 || August 13 || @ Red Sox || W 2–0 || Verlander (13–6) || Buchholz (1–3) || Rodney (24) || 37,556 || 60–54
|- bgcolor="bbffbb"
| 115 || August 14 || Royals || W 1–0 || Lyon (5–4) || Colón (1–2) || || 34,799 || 61–54
|- bgcolor="bbffbb"
| 116 || August 15 || Royals || W 10–3 || Jackson (6–6) || Hochevar (9–5) || || 37,276 || 62–54
|- bgcolor="ffbbbb"
| 117 || August 16 || Royals || L 3–2 (10) || Soria (3–0) || Rodney (2–3) || || 32,888 || 62–55
|- bgcolor="bbffbb"
| 118 || August 18 || Mariners || W 5–3 || Seay (3–2) || Lowe (1–6) || Rodney (25) || 33,710 || 63–55
|- bgcolor="ffbbbb"
| 119 || August 19 || Mariners || L 3–1 || Snell (3–9) || Verlander (13–7) || Aardsma (28)|| 33,194 || 63–56
|- bgcolor="bbffbb"
| 120 || August 20 || Mariners || W 7–6 || Seay (4–2) || Aardsma (3–5) || || 31,167 || 64–56
|- bgcolor="bbffbb"
| 121 || August 21 || @ Athletics || W 3–2 || Jackson (10–5) || Gonzalez (4–4)|| Rodney (26) || 15,927 || 65–56
|- bgcolor="ffbbbb"
| 122 || August 22 || @ Athletics || L 3–2 || Bailey (6–3) || Miner (5–4)|| || 26,266 || 65–57
|- bgcolor="ffbbbb"
| 123 || August 23 || @ Athletics || L 9–4 || Tomko (3–2) || Porcello (10–8) || || 17,690|| 65–58
|- bgcolor="bbffbb"
| 124 || August 24 || @ Angels || W 10–7 || Verlander (14–7) || Weaver (13–5) || Rodney (27) || 38,421 || 66–58
|- bgcolor="bbffbb"
| 125 || August 25 || @ Angels || W 5–3 || Washburn (9–7) || Lackey (8–7) || Rodney (28) || 42,970 || 67–58
|- bgcolor="ffbbbb"
| 126 || August 26 || @ Angels || L 4–2 || Saunders (10–7) || Jackson (10–6) || Fuentes (36) || 36,329 || 67–59
|- bgcolor="bbffbb"
| 127 || August 28 || Rays || W 6–2 || Porcello (11–8) || Garza (7–9) || ||35,030 || 68–59
|- bgcolor="ffbbbb"
| 128 || August 29 || Rays || L 3–1 || Price (7–6) || Robertson (1–1) || Howell (16) || 39,296 || 68–60
|- bgcolor="bbffbb"
| 129 || August 30 || Rays || W 4–3 || Verlander (15–7) || Balfour (5–3) || Rodney (29) || 36,067 || 69–60
|- bgcolor="ffbbbb"
| 130 || August 31 || Rays || L 11–7 || Shields (9–10) || Washburn (9–8) || || 26,533|| 69–61
|-

|- bgcolor="bbffbb"
| 131 || September 1 || Indians || W 8–5 || Jackson (11–6) || Carrasco (0–1) || Rodney (30) ||24,225 || 70–61
|- bgcolor="bbffbb"
| 132 || September 2 || Indians || W 4–2 || Porcello (12–8) || Laffey (7–4) || Rodney (31) || 25,840 || 71–61
|- bgcolor="bbffbb"
| 133 || September 3 || Indians || W 4–3 (10) || Miner (6–4) || Pérez (4–3) || || 28,267 || 72–61
|- bgcolor="bbffbb"
| 134 || September 4 || @ Rays || W 4–3 || Verlander (16–7) || Howell (7–5) || Rodney (32) || 18,596 || 73–61
|- bgcolor="bbffbb"
| 135 || September 5 || @ Rays || W 8–6 || Seay (5–2) || Balfour (5–4) || Lyon (2) || 36,973 || 74–61
|- bgcolor="bbffbb"
| 136 || September 6 || @ Rays || W 5–3 || Jackson (12–6) || Springer (0–3) || Lyon (3) || 28,059|| 75–61
|- bgcolor="ffbbbb"
| 137 || September 8 || @ Royals || L 7–5 || Yabuta (1–1) || Seay (5–3) || Soria (23) || 12,032|| 75–62
|- bgcolor="ffbbbb"
| 138 || September 9 || @ Royals || L 5–1 || Tejeda (2–1) || Verlander (16–8) || Soria (24) ||10,584 || 75–63
|- bgcolor="ffbbbb"
| 139 || September 10 || @ Royals || L 7–4 || Colón (2–3) || Miner (6–5) || Rosa (1)|| 12,029 || 75–64
|- bgcolor="ffbbbb"
| 140 || September 11 || Blue Jays || W 6–4 || Tallet (7–9) || Robertson (1–2) || Frasor (9) || 31,575|| 75–65
|- bgcolor="ffbbbb"
| 141 || September 12 || Blue Jays || L 8–6 || League (3–5) || Rodney (2–4) || Frasor (10) || 36,142 || 75–66
|- bgcolor="bbffbb"
| 142 || September 13 || Blue Jays || W 7–2 || Porcello (13–8) || Romero (12–8) || || 32,468 || 76–66
|- bgcolor="bbffbb"
| 143 || September 14 || Blue Jays || W 6–5 (10) || Seay (6–3) || Wolfe (1–2) || || 24,375|| 77–66
|- bgcolor="ffbbbb"
| 144 || September 15 || Royals || L 11–1 || Tejeda (3–1) || Washburn (9–9) || || 20,422 || 77–67
|- bgcolor="bbffbb"
| 145 || September 16 || Royals || W 4–3 || Miner (7–5) || DiNardo (0–1) || Rodney (33)|| 25,400 || 78–67
|- bgcolor="ffbbbb"
| 146 || September 17 || Royals || L 9–2 || Greinke (14–8)|| Jackson (12–7) || || 26,457 || 78–68
|- bgcolor="ffbbbb"
| 147 || September 18 || @ Twins || L 3–0 || Duensing (4–1) || Porcello (13–9) || Nathan (42) ||32,693 || 78–69
|- bgcolor="ffbbbb"
| 148 || September 19 || @ Twins || L 6–2 || Crain (6–4) || Verlander (16–9)|| || 43,338 || 78–70
|- bgcolor="bbffbb"
| 149 || September 20 || @ Twins || W 6–2 || Robertson (2–2) || Baker (13–9) || ||36,335 || 79–70 
|- bgcolor="bbffbb"
| 150 || September 22 || @ Indians || W 3–1 || Jackson (13–7) || Laffey (7–7) || Rodney (34) || 23,217|| 80–70
|- bgcolor="bbffbb"
| 151 || September 23 || @ Indians || W 11–3 || Porcello (14–9) || Masterson (4–9) || ||13,971 || 81–70 
|- bgcolor="bbffbb"
| 152 || September 24 || @ Indians || W 6–5 || Verlander (17–9) || Carrasco (0–3) ||Rodney (35) ||23,516 || 82–70
|- bgcolor="ffbbbb"
| 153 || September 25 || @ White Sox || L 2–0 || Peavy (8–6) || Bonine (0–2) || Thornton (2) || 30,794|| 82–71
|- bgcolor="bbffbb"
| 154 || September 26 || @ White Sox || W 12–5|| Figaro (2–1) || García (2–4) || || 35,590 || 83–71
|- bgcolor="ffbbbb"
| 155 || September 27 || @ White Sox || L 8–4 || Hudson (1–1) || Jackson (13–8) || Thornton (3) || 33,685 || 83–72
|- bgcolor="bbbbbb"
| || September 28 || Twins || colspan=6 | Postponed (rain) – rescheduled for September 29 
|- bgcolor="ffbbbb"
| 156 || September 29 || Twins || L 3–2 (10) || Rauch (6–3) || Lyon (6–5) || Nathan (45) || 35,243|| 83–73 
|- bgcolor="bbffbb"
| 157 || September 29 || Twins || W 6–5 || Verlander (18–9) || Duensing (5–2) || Rodney (36) || 30,240|| 84–73
|- bgcolor="bbffbb"
| 158 || September 30 || Twins || W 7–2 || Bonine (1–1) || Pavano (13–12) || || 34,775 || 85–73
|-

|- bgcolor="ffbbbb"
| 159 || October 1 || Twins || L 8–3 || Baker (15–9) || Robertson (2–3) || || 40,533|| 85–74
|- bgcolor="ffbbbb"
| 160 || October 2 || White Sox || L 8–0 || Peavy (9–6) || Jackson (13–9) || || 34,726 || 85–75
|- bgcolor="ffbbbb"
| 161 || October 3 || White Sox || L 5–1 || García (3–4) || Figaro (2–2) || || 35,184 || 85–76
|- bgcolor="bbffbb"
| 162 || October 4 || White Sox || W 5–3 || Verlander (19–9) || Danks (13–11) || Rodney (37)|| 35,806 || 86–76
|- bgcolor="ffbbbb"
| 163 || October 6 || @ Twins || L 6–5 (12) || Keppel (1–1) || Rodney (2–5) || || 54,088|| 86–77
|-

Player stats
Through October 6, 2009

Batting
Note: G = Games played; AB = At bats; H = Hits; Avg. = Batting average; HR = Home runs; RBI = Runs batted in

Pitchers batting statistics not included.

Starting and other pitchers 
Note: G = Games pitched; IP = Innings pitched; W = Wins; L = Losses; ERA = Earned run average; SO = Strikeouts

Relief pitchers 
Note: G = Games pitched; W = Wins; L = Losses; SV = Saves; HLD = Holds; ERA = Earned run average; SO = Strikeouts

* No longer on active roster

Farm system

See also

 2009 in baseball

References

External links
Fox Sports Detroit official site – 2009 Detroit Tigers telecast schedule
The Detroit News Tigers newsfeed (updated daily)
Detroit Tigers game-time forecasts (from weather.com) (updated daily)
2009 Detroit Tigers season at Baseball Reference

Detroit Tigers seasons
Detroit Tigers
Detroit
2009 in Detroit